"When You Tell Me That You Love Me" is a song by American singer Diana Ross, released on August 20, 1991 as the lead single from her nineteenth studio album, The Force Behind the Power (1991). The song was released on the Motown label in the United States and by EMI Records in the United Kingdom. It was written by Albert Hammond and John Bettis, and produced by Peter Asher. A sentimental ballad, it became the album's biggest hit, peaking at number 37 on the US Billboard R&B singles chart and number two on the UK Singles Chart. Ross considers it one of her signature songs and it was subsequently covered by various artists. The UK release of "When You Tell Me That You Love Me" included her 1985 hit "Chain Reaction".

Critical reception
Larry Flick from Billboard described the song as "a dramatically produced power ballad. Gratefully, track is less trend-conscious than Ross's more recent efforts, though this is far from her strongest work. Regardless, diehard fans will love it—as will AC radio programmers." Henderson and DeVaney from Cashbox called it a "highly commercial pop ballad" and a "slick single". In the review of the album, the magazine declared it as a "potential hit" and a "dramatic ballad". Jan DeKnock from Chicago Tribune named it the album's "strongest ballad". A reviewer from Liverpool Echo wrote, "And while Diana Ross's voice couldn't be more different, this track does have some of that radio-friendly style. It starts like a sophisticated ballad, with quiet piano and voice. and builds into an emotional climax, complete with a bit of rock guitar. It's perfectly produced and perfectly predictable." Connie Johnson from Los Angeles Times viewed it as "a gorgeously gushy ballad that’s perfect for Ross’ theatrical delivery. Peter Asher had a hand in producing this track, on which Ross manages to appear unpretentious and guilelessly sweet." Newcastle Evening Chronicle remarked the singer's "romantic mood" on the song. Stephen Holden from New York Times felt it "strongly echoes the sentiments" of "Wind Beneath My Wings".

Music video
The single's accompanying music video featured scenes of Ross in an evening gown singing on stage intercut with home video footage of Ross with her two sons Ross & Evan.

Track listings

 US 7-inch and cassette single 
A. "When You Tell Me That You Love Me" (LP version) – 4:10
B. "You and I" – 4:05

 UK 7-inch and cassette single 
 "When You Tell Me That You Love Me" (LP version) – 4:10
 "Chain Reaction" (single version) – 3:47

 UK 12-inch single 
A1. "When You Tell Me That You Love Me" (LP version)
B1. "Chain Reaction" (12-inch version)
B2. "You and I"

 UK CD single 
 "When You Tell Me That You Love Me" (LP version)
 "Chain Reaction" (single version)
 "You and I"

 Japanese mini-CD single 
 "When You Tell Me That You Love Me" (LP version)
 "Supremes Medley"
Note: "Supreme Medley" consists of five songs by the Supremes: "Baby Love", "Stop! In the Name of Love", "You Can't Hurry Love", "You Keep Me Hangin' On", and "Love Is Like an Itchin' in My Heart"

Personnel
 Diana Ross: lead vocals
 Robbie Buchanan: keyboards
 Michael Landau: guitar
 Freddie Washington: bass
 Carlos Vega: drums
 Michael Fisher: percussion
 David Campbell: BV arrangements, orchestra arrangements and conductor
 Gavyn Wright: orchestra leader
 Isobel Griffiths: orchestra contractor
 Peter Asher: backing vocals
 Valerie Carter: backing vocals
 Kate Markowitz: backing vocals

Charts

Weekly charts

Year-end charts

Certifications

Release history

Julio Iglesias versions

With Dolly Parton

The song was recorded in a duet form by American singer Dolly Parton and Spanish singer Julio Iglesias for the latter's 1994 album Crazy. A single was released in 1994 which managed to chart in the Netherlands for three weeks: entering at position 48, peaking at 45, and in its final week charting at number 49. Parton included this song on her 4-disc compilation box set, The Tour Collection.

Critical reception
Fell and Rufer from the Gavin Report wrote, "It's hard to beat the box office combo of a ladies' man and a man's woman. Julio and Dolly get the David Foster treatment with an expensive sounding arrangement worthy of such stars."

Music video
The accompanying music video was directed by John Hopgood, and was filmed for the single at Oheka Castle on Long Island's north shore. The sepia-toned clip features Iglesias and Parton singing in separate rooms and a love scene involving a younger couple. At the end of the video Parton and Iglesias are shown leaving the castle. Parton having changed from a white nightgown into a black cocktail dress.

Charts

With CoCo Lee
In 1998, Iglesias re-recorded the duet with Chinese singer Coco Lee (李玟) and released it as a single to promote his compilation My Life: The Greatest Hits. Despite this, CoCo Lee's version was not included on the actual album, but rather Parton's. A music video was released featuring Iglesias and Lee singing together in a recording studio intercut with scenes of Lee walking around in a trench coat. At the end of the video Iglesias and Lee sit down to a candlelit dinner.

Westlife version

"When You Tell Me That You Love Me" is the second single released from Westlife's sixth studio album, Face to Face (2005). It features vocals from original artist Diana Ross. The single peaked at No. 2 on the UK Singles Chart, just losing out on the top spot by a mere 171 copies. The song was the 39th best selling single of 2005 in the UK. It debuted with 40,708 combined physical and download sales in the UK alone. The single reached 120 000 copies sold in UK so far. This single marked its fourteenth year since the original Diana Ross version was released and peaked at No. 2, the same chart position in the UK Singles Chart in 1991.

It missed becoming the Christmas Single for 2005 by just 170 units, as had happened to the original. It also peaked at No. 2 in Ireland and Scotland. It is the band's nineteenth best selling single in paid-for sales category and in best selling single combined sales category in the United Kingdom as of January 2019.

Music video
The video features Westlife and Ross singing on a stage together. The members of Westlife are wearing dark suits whilst Ross wears a long white dress and later in the video, a gold dress. New excerpts from the music video with Ross, that didn't make the cut on the official video, was used on television performances by the band of the song for the premiere promotional release week of it as a single.

Track listing
 UK CD1
 "When You Tell Me That You Love Me" (Single Mix) – 4:01
 "White Christmas" – 3:34
 "The Way You Look Tonight" (Westlife Only Version) – 4:07

 UK CD2
 "When You Tell Me That You Love Me" (Single Mix) – 4:00
 "If I Let You Go" (Acoustic Version) – 3:40

Charts

American Idol finalists - Season 4 version
The 12 American Idol finalists - Season 4 Finalists got together perform this song. It was selected as the American Red Cross Disaster Relief Single in 2005 for the American Idol TV show. It also appears on the American Idol Season 4: The Showstoppers compilation album.

References

External links
 
 Official Westlife website

1991 singles
1991 songs
1994 singles
2005 singles
Diana Ross songs
Westlife songs
Julio Iglesias songs
Dolly Parton songs
Sissel Kyrkjebø songs
Songs written by Albert Hammond
Songs with lyrics by John Bettis
Pop ballads
Song recordings produced by David Foster
Song recordings produced by Peter Asher
Motown singles
Soul ballads
2000s ballads
Sony Music singles
RCA Records singles
Sony BMG singles
EMI Records singles